Mavalli  is a village in the southern state of Karnataka, India. It is located in the Bhatkal taluk of Uttara Kannada district in Karnataka.

Demographics
 India census, Mavalli had a population of 15409 with 7616 males and 7793 females.

See also
 Uttara Kannada
 Mangalore
 Districts of Karnataka

References

External links
 

Villages in Uttara Kannada district